Mascoma may refer to:

Locations in the United States
The Mascoma River in New Hampshire
Mascoma Lake in New Hampshire

Derived from the river or lake
Mascoma Corporation, a biofuel company
Mascoma Valley Regional High School, Canaan, New Hampshire, United States
USS Mascoma (AO-83), a U.S. Navy vessel in World War II